is a former Japanese football player. He played for Japan national team.

Club career
Hasegawa was born in Hyogo Prefecture on April 14, 1957. After graduating from Osaka University of Commerce, he joined Yanmar Diesel in 1980. The club won the league champions in 1980. The club also won 1983 and 1984 JSL Cup. He retired in 1987. He played 75 games and scored 24 goals in the league. He was selected Best Eleven in 1982.

National team career
On November 19, 1978, when Hasegawa was an Osaka University of Commerce student, he debuted for Japan national team against Soviet Union. He was selected by Japan for the 1978 Asian Games. In 1980, he also played at 1980 Summer Olympics qualification and 1982 World Cup qualification. He played 15 games and scored 4 goals for Japan until 1981.

National team statistics

References

External links
 
 Japan National Football Team Database

1957 births
Living people
Osaka University of Commerce alumni
Association football people from Hyōgo Prefecture
Japanese footballers
Japan international footballers
Japan Soccer League players
Cerezo Osaka players
Footballers at the 1978 Asian Games
Association football forwards
Asian Games competitors for Japan